Nicolaus Zangius (also Zange; 1570–1619) was a German composer.

Zangius was born in Woltersdorf, and became kapellmeister for Philipp Sigismund, Prince Bishop of Osnabrück and later John Sigismund, Elector of Brandenburg.  He died in Berlin.

Works, editions and recordings
Schoene newe außerlesene Geistliche und Weltliche Lieder mit drey Stimmen. Frankfurt an der Oder 1594.
Geistliche und weltliche Lieder mit fünf Stimmen. Cologne 1597.

Modern editions
Geistliche und weltliche Lieder mit fünf Stimmen. Merseburger 1960.
Ducke dich, Hänsel. Möseler-Verlag 1972.
Dialogus 1617. Moeck 1972.
Der Kölner Markt. Edition Peters 1986.

References

1570 births
1619 deaths
German Baroque composers
Music directors of the Berlin State Opera
17th-century classical composers
German male classical composers
People from Oder-Spree
17th-century male musicians